Kiril Denev (born 1905, date of death unknown) was a Bulgarian footballer. He played in one match for the Bulgaria national football team in 1926. He was also part of Bulgaria's squad for the football tournament at the 1924 Summer Olympics, but he did not play in any matches.

References

External links
 

1905 births
Year of death missing
Bulgarian footballers
Bulgaria international footballers
Place of birth missing
Association football midfielders